Netanel Hochberg (born 20 December 1897 - died 27 January 1983) was an Israeli agronomist and expert in the  growing of grapevine.

Biography 
Hochberg was born in Ness Ziona, Ottoman-ruled Palestine (present day Israel) in 1897. He studied agriculture at the Mikveh Israel agricultural school, to the south of Tel Aviv, and then at Utrecht University. After completing his studies abroad, he returned to Palestine and became a teacher at Mikveh Israel.

Hochberg was married to Hannah Rozanski. Their eldest son Dan was killed in the 1948 Arab-Israeli War at age 17, and their youngest son Natan was one of the founders of the Mikveh Israel Winery. Hannah died in 1955.

Hochberg created a number of new varieties of vine, the first of which he called "Dan ben Hannah" (Dan son of Hannah), named after his son Dan and wife Hannah.

Awards 
 In 1955, Hochberg was awarded the Israel Prize, for agriculture.

See also 
List of Israel Prize recipients
Hochberg

References 

Utrecht University alumni
Israel Prize in agriculture recipients
Jewish scientists
Israeli agronomists
Israeli Jews
1983 deaths
Jews in Mandatory Palestine
Jews in Ottoman Palestine
1897 births
20th-century agronomists